Hear & Now is an album by trumpeter Don Cherry recorded in 1976 and released on the Atlantic label.

Reception

The AllMusic review by Andrew Hamilton awarded the album 2½ stars stating "An average collection from Cherry, respectable and inoffensive".

In a review for All About Jazz, Chris May warned: "if you only acquire one Don Cherry album in your life, don't acquire this one," and commented: "There are some great musicians on the album... but it's not enough to lift the proceedings."

Phil Johnson, writing for The Independent, stated: "It's all over the place stylistically, from Indian mysticism to heavy metal, played by bizarre bands... And yet at least a couple of the tracks... are amazing, presaging Bill Laswell's funky world-fusion."

A reviewer for Head Heritage commented: "a Don Cherry LP bowing to commercial acceptability is a damn sight better than many other artists of the time reaching for similar acceptance, and there are moments of high-brilliance amongst the clotted, over-sentimentalized, clinical pap."

Track listing
All composions by Don Cherry except as indicated
 "Mahakali" - 9:50 
 "Universal Mother" (Sherab-Barry Bryant, Cherry) - 6:46 
 "Karmapa Chenno" - 7:14 
 "California" - 2:51 
 "Buddha's Blues" - 3:40 
 "Eagle Eye" - 0:55 
 "Surrender Rose" (Narada Michael Walden) - 3:32 
 "Journey of Milarepa/Shanti/The Ending Movement-Liberation [from Welkin of Infinity]" (Cherry/Cherry/Stan Samole) - 10:12 
Recorded at Electric Lady Studios in New York in December 1976.

Personnel
Don Cherry - trumpet, bells, conch, flute, vocals
Michael Brecker - saxophone 
Collin Walcott - sitar 
Moki Cherry - tamboura 
Ronald Dean Miller, Stan Samole - guitar 
Lois Colin - harp 
Cliff Carter - keyboards 
Narada Michael Walden - piano, timpani, tom tom 
Marcus Miller, Neil Jason - bass 
Sammy Figueroa - congas
Tony Williams, Lenny White, Steve Jordan - drums 
Raphael Cruz - percussion 
Cheryl Alexander - vocals
Patty Scialfa - vocals

References

Don Cherry (trumpeter) albums
1977 albums
Albums produced by Narada Michael Walden
Atlantic Records albums